= Neurologic Clinics =

- Discipline: Medicine
- Language: English

Publication details
- Publisher: Elsevier
- Impact factor: 3.787 (2021)

Standard abbreviations
- ISO 4: Neurol. Clin.

Links
- Journal homepage; Online archive

Neurologic Clinics is a medical journal that covers neurology-related topics, such as multiple sclerosis, epilepsy, stroke, headache, sleep disorders, pediatric-specific neurology etc. The journal is published by Elsevier.

== Abstracting and indexing ==
The journal is abstracted and indexed in:

- Embase
- PubMed/Medline
- Current Contents - Clinical Medicine
- PsycINFO

According to the Journal Citation Reports, the journal has a 2021 impact factor of 3.787.
